Črenšovci is a settlement in the Prekmurje region in northeastern Slovenia. It is the seat of the Municipality of Črenšovci. Črnec Creek, a tributary of the Ledava, flows past the settlement.

The parish church in Črenšovci is dedicated to the Holy Cross and belongs to the Roman Catholic Diocese of Murska Sobota. It was built in 1860 on the site of an earlier church originating from the early 14th century.

Notable people
Notable people that were born or lived in Črenšovci include:
Jakab Szabár (1802/3–1863), priest and writer
Vilmos Tkálecz (1894–19??), schoolmaster and politician

References

External links

Črenšovci on Geopedia

Populated places in the Municipality of Črenšovci